The Toyota A Series engines are a family of inline-four internal combustion engines with displacement from 1.3 L to 1.8 L produced by Toyota Motor Corporation. The series has cast iron engine blocks and aluminum cylinder heads. To make the engine as short as possible, the cylinders are siamesed.

The development of the series began in the late 1970s, when Toyota wanted to develop a completely new engine for the Toyota Tercel, the successor of Toyota's K engine. The goal was to achieve good fuel efficiency and performance as well as low emissions with a modern design. The A-series includes one of the first Japanese mass-production DOHC, four-valve-per-cylinder engines, the 4A-GE, and a later version of the same engine was one of the first production five-valve-per-cylinder engines.

Toyota joint venture partner Tianjin FAW Xiali produces the 1.3 L 8A and resumed production of the 5A in 2007.

1A

The 1.5 L 1A was produced between 1978 and 1980. All variants were belt-driven 8-valve counter-flow SOHC engines with a single, twin-barrel downdraft carburetor. It used Toyota's Turbulence Generating Pot (TGP) lean combustion system to meet Japanese emissions standards at the time with only an oxidation (2-way) catalyst.

1A-C
Applications:
 AL10 Tercel

1A-U
Using Toyota two-way catalyst.

Output:

Applications:
 AL10 Tercel/Corsa (Japan only)

2A

The 1.3 L 2A was produced from 1979 through 1989. 2A engines in 1982 onwards AL20 Tercels have a slightly different valve cover and timing belt cover than early AL11 Tercels, as well as an automatic choke, and automatically controlled hot air intake (HAI) system. It also has higher compression ratio, and reformulated combustion chambers to improve the fuel economy and emissions. All variants used belt-driven SOHC eight-valve counter-flow cylinder heads with a single downdraft carburetor.

2A, 2A-L, 2A-LC
Output:

Applications:
 AE80 Corolla 1983–1985 (excluding Japan, 2A-LC in Australia)
 AL11 Tercel 1979–1982 (excluding Japan and North America)
 AL20 Tercel 1982–1984 (excluding Japan and North America)

2A-U, 2A-LU
Using Toyota TTC-C catalytic converter.

Output:

Applications:
 AE80 Corolla 1983–1985 (Japan only)
 AL20 Corolla II 1982–1986 (Japan only)
 AL11 Corsa (Japan only)
 AL20 Corsa 1982–1989 (Japan only)
 AE80 Sprinter 1983–1985 (Japan only)
 AL11 Tercel
 AL20 Tercel 1982–1989 (Japan only)

3A

The 1.5 L 3A was produced from 1979 through 1989. The 3A engine is the successor of Toyota's first A engine, the 1A. All variants were belt-driven eight-valve counter-flow SOHC engines but no longer used Toyota's "Turbulence Generating Pot" pre-combustion system from the 1A.

3A, 3A-C

Output:
  at 4,500 rpm (N. America, AL-21 3 door liftback)
  at 4,800 rpm (N. America, AL-25 5-door wagon)

Applications:
 AL12 Tercel 1979–1982 (excluding Japan)
 AL21/25 Tercel 1982–1988 (excluding Japan)

3A-U, 3A-LU
Using Toyota TTC-C catalytic converter. On some models marked as 3A-II.

Output:

Applications:
 AA60 Carina 1981–1987 (Japan only)
 AT150 Carina 1984–1988 (Japan only)
 AE70 Corolla 1979–1983 (Japan only)
 AE81/85 Corolla 1983–1987 (Japan only)
 AL21 Corolla II 1982–1986 (Japan only)
 AT140 Corona 1982–1987 (Japan only)
 AT150 Corona 1983–1987 (Japan only)
 AL12 Corsa (Japan only)
 AL21/25 Corsa 1982–1989 (Japan only)
 AW10 MR2 1984–1989 (Japan only)
 AE70 Sprinter 1979–1983 (Japan only)
 AE81/85 Sprinter 1983–1987 (Japan only)
 AL25 Sprinter Carib 1982–1988 (Japan only)
 AL21/25 Tercel 1982–1989 (Japan only)

3A-HU
High compression version with Toyota TTC-C catalytic converter.

Output:

Applications:
 AL21 Corolla II 1982–1984 (Japan only)
 AL21 Corsa 1982–1984 (Japan only)
 AL21 Tercel 1982–1984 (Japan only)

3A-SU
Twin carburetted swirl-intake version with Toyota TTC-C catalytic converter, introduced in August 1984 along with a facelift for the Tercel (and its sister variants) in Japan. Features two variable-venturi carburetors, which Toyota wanted to test in Japan before launching them in export along E series engine, albeit in single carburetted version. Because of the swirl-intake, the sealing surface between cylinder head and valve cover is different from other SOHC A-engines, featuring vertical curves on the manifold side of the head. Thus, those parts are not interchangeable between each other. The swirl was supposed to improve burning of the air-fuel mixture, thus enabling cleaner emissions, improving fuel economy, and increasing power.

Output:
  at 6,000 rpm (compression at 9.3:1)

Applications:
 AL21 Corolla II 1984–1986 (Japan only)
 AL21/25 Corsa 1984–1989 (Japan only)
 AL25 Sprinter Carib 1984–1988 (Japan only)
 AL21/25 Tercel 1984–1989 (Japan only)

4A

The 4A was produced from 1980 through 2002.

Numerous variations of the 4A design were produced, from basic SOHC 8-valve all the way to DOHC 20-valve versions.

4A, 4A-C, 4A-L, 4A-LC

North American market engines:
 4A-LC 1.6 L I4, 8-valve SOHC,  at 4800 rpm

 4A-C 1.6 L I4, 8-valve SOHC,  at 5200 rpm

European (and other) market engines: (excepting Sweden and Switzerland)
 4A-L 1.6 L, I4, 8-valve SOHC,  at 5600 rpm, and torque  at 4000 rpm (compression at 9.0:1) (Indonesia)
 4A-L 1.6 L, I4, 8-valve SOHC,  at 5600 rpm, and torque  at 3600 rpm (compression at 9.3:1) (Europe)

Australian/Swiss/Swedish market engines:
Australia, Sweden, and Switzerland shared emissions rules for a period in the 1970s and eighties.
 4A-LC 1.6 L, I4, 8-valve SOHC,  at 5600 rpm

Applications
 AT151 Carina II 1983–1987 (Europe only)
 AT160 Celica 1985–1989 (excluding Japan)
 AE71 Corolla 1982–1984 (North America, Australia & South Africa only)
 AE82/86 Corolla 1983–1987 (excluding Japan)
 AT151 Corona 1983–1987 (excluding Japan)
 A60 Daihatsu Charmant 1984-1987 (excluding Japan)
 Elfin Type 3 Clubman
 Chevrolet Nova (USA NUMMI rebadged Sprinter) 1985-1988

4A-ELU
Fuel injection was added.
This version is also equipped with Toyota TTC-C catalytic converter.

Applications:
 AT151 Carina 1984–1988 (Japan only)
 AE82 Corolla 1983–1987 (Japan only)
 AE82 Sprinter 1983–1987 (Japan only)

4A-F
A narrow-valve (22.3°) DOHC 16-valve carburetor-equipped version, the 4A-F, was produced from 1987 through 1990.

Applications:
 AT171 Carina II 1987–1992 (Europe only)
 AE92/95 Corolla 1987–1992 (excluding Japan)
 AE95 Corolla 1988–1989 (Japan only)
 AE101 Corolla 1992–1998 (Asia, Africa & Latin-America)
 AE111 Corolla 1997–2001 (Asia, Africa & Latin-America)
 AT171/177 Corona 1987–1992 (excluding Japan)
 AE95 Sprinter 1988–1989 (Japan only)

4A-FE

The fuel injected 4A-FE is the successor of the carbureted 4A-F, manufactured from 1987–2001. Toyota designed this engine with fuel economy in mind. The 4A-FE is basically the same as the 4A-F (introduced in the sixth generation of Corollas), the most apparent difference being the electronic fuel injection system as noted by the 'E'. The engine was succeeded by the 3ZZ-FE, a 1.6-liter engine with VVT-i technology.

There are three generations of this engine, which can be identified by the external shape of the engine. The first generation (1987–1996) featured a plate on the head which read "16 valve EFI" and fuel injectors in the head.

The second generation had a higher profile cam design in the head, a cam cover with ribs throughout its length, and fuel injectors in the intake manifold runners. Mechanically, the late-model engines received MAP load sensing and redesigned pistons, intake ports, and intake manifold. The second generation engine was produced from 1992–1998 (1993–1996 in the US).

The third generation (1996–2001) was released exclusively for the Asian market (Japan, Philippines, Pakistan, Thailand, Indonesia, and Malaysia) only. Although it is very similar to the second generation externally, it only has a slight difference in the top section of the intake manifold and throttle body. This last generation also has a higher additional output of  compared to the second generation.

 Engine displacement: 
 Layout: DOHC Inline-4
 Valves: 16, 4 for each cylinder
 Redline: 6300 rpm
 Compression ratio: 9.5:1
 Fuel Delivery System: TCCS or MPFI

North American market engines:
  at 5,800 rpm, and torque  at 4,800 rpm

European market engines:
  at 6,000 rpm, and torque  at 3,200 rpm

Asian market engines:
  at 6,000 rpm

Note: power and torque specs for North America and Europe are from the 1988–1992 Corollas. 

The 4A-FE is different from the 4A-GE in terms of performance and power. Although both have the same displacement and are DOHC, they were optimized for different uses. The first obvious difference are the valves, the engine's intake and exhaust valves were placed 22.3° apart (compared to 50° in the G-Engines). The second is that it employed a "slave cam system", the camshafts being geared together and driven off one camshaft's sprocket (both camshafts' sprockets on the G-Engine are rotated by the timing belt). Some of the less directly visible differences were poorly shaped ports in the earlier versions, a slow burning combustion chamber with heavily shrouded valves, less aggressive camshaft profiles, a cast crankshaft (rather than a forged crankshaft in the 4A-GE), ports of a small cross sectional area, a very restrictive intake manifold with long runners joined to a small displacement plenum and other changes. Even though the valve angle is closer to what is considered in some racing circles to be ideal for power (approximately 25 degrees), its other design differences and the intake which is tuned for a primary harmonic resonance at low RPM means that it has about 10% less power compared to the 4A-GE engine. This engine design improves fuel efficiency and torque, but compromises power.

Applications

 AT220 Avensis 1997–2000 (excluding Japan)
 AT171/175 Carina 1988–1992 (Japan only)
 AT190 Carina 1984–1996 (Japan only)
 AT171 Carina II 1987–1992 (Europe only)
 AT190 Carina E 1992–1997 (Europe only)
 AT180 Celica 1989–1993 (excluding Japan)
 AE92/95 Corolla 1988–1997
 AE101/104/109 Corolla 1991–2002
 AE111/114 Corolla 1995–2002
 AE101 Corolla Ceres 1992–1998 (Japan only)
 AE111 Corolla Spacio 1997–2001 (Japan only)
 AT175 Corona 1988–1992 (Japan only)
 AT190 Corona 1992–1996
 AT210 Corona 1996–2001
 AE95 Sprinter 1989–1991 (Japan only)
 AE101/104/109 Sprinter 1992–2002 (Japan only)
 AE111/114 Sprinter 1995–1998 (Japan only)
 AE95 Sprinter Carib 1988–1990 (Japan only)
 AE111/114 Sprinter Carib 1996–2001 (Japan only)
 AE101 Sprinter Marino 1992–1998 (Japan only)
 AE92/AE111 Corolla/Conquest 1993–2002 (South Africa)
 Geo Prizm base model (based on Toyota AE92 chassis) 1989–1997

4A-FHE
Same as the first generation 4A-FE, only more aggressive tune for more output. Called an EFI-S engine.

Output:

Applications:
 AT171 Carina 1990–1992 (Japan only)
 AE95 Sprinter Carib 1990–1995 (Japan only)

4A-GE (16-valve)

The cylinder head was developed by Yamaha Motor Corporation and was built at Toyota's Shimoyama plant alongside the 4A and 2A engines. The reliability and performance of these engines has earned them a fair number of enthusiasts and a fan base as they are a popular choice for an engine swap into other Toyota cars such as the KE70 and KP61. New performance parts are still available for sale even today because of its strong fan base. Production of the various models of this version lasted for five generations, from May 1983 through 1991 for 16-valve versions and the 20-valve 4A-GE lasting through 2000.

First Generation "Blue Top" (Early Bigport) 
The first-generation 4A-GE which was introduced in May 1983 replaced the 2T-G as Toyota's most popular twincam engine. This engine was identifiable via silver cam covers with the lettering on the upper cover painted black and blue, as well as the presence of three reinforcement ribs on the back side of the block. It was extremely light and strong for a production engine using an all-iron block, weighing in at only  - over fifteen percent reduction compared to 2T-GEU. It was also 4 dB quieter. While originally conceived of as a two-valve design, Toyota and Yamaha changed the 4A-GE to a four-valve after a year of evaluation.

However, this was a gross power rating and the engine was later re-rated at  net. Nonetheless, Japanese cars tested no faster than their American counterparts despite their higher power rating and a lower curb weight.

Yamaha designed the engine for performance; the valve angle was a relatively wide 50 degrees, which at the time was believed to be ideal for high power production. Today, more modern high-revving engines have decreased the valve angle to 20 to 25 degrees, which allows for a more smaller and compact head. This is now believed by some to be ideal for high-revving engines with high specific power outputs. However, most high performance racing engines still employ wide valve angles which allow straighter ports and more efficient flow.

The first-generation 4A-GE is nicknamed the "bigport" engine because it had intake ports of a very large cross-sectional area. While the port cross-section was suitable for a very highly modified engine at very high engine speeds, it caused a considerable drop in low-end torque due to the decreased air speeds at those rpms. To compensate for the reduced air speed, the first-generation engines included the T-VIS feature, in which dual intake runners are fitted with butterfly valves that opened at approximately 4,200 rpm. The effect is that at lower rpm (when the airspeed would normally be slow) four of the eight runners are closed, which forces the engine to draw in all its air through half the runners in the manifold. This not only raises the airspeed which causes better cylinder filling, but due to the asymmetrical airflow a swirl is created in the combustion chamber, meaning better fuel atomization. This enabled the torque curve to still be intact at lower engine speeds, allowing for better performance across the entire speed band and a broad, flat torque curve around the crossover point. During rising engine speed, a slight lurch can occur at the crossover point and an experienced driver will be able to detect the shift in performance. Production of the first-generation engine model lasted until May 1987.

Second Generation "Red & Black Top" (Late Bigport) 
The second-generation 4A-GE produced from June 1987 to May 1989 featured larger diameter bearings for the connecting-rod big ends  and added four additional reinforcement ribs on the back of the engine block, for a total of seven. The T-VIS feature is retained, as well as the MAP sensor (MAF sensor in the US-market). The first- and second-generation engines are very popular with racers and tuners because of their availability, ease of modification, simple design, and lightness.

Third Generation "Red Top" (Smallport) 
The third-generation appeared in June 1989 and was in production until June 1991. This engine has the silver cam covers with the words only written in red, hence the nickname "red top". Toyota increased the compression ratio from 9.4:1 to 10.3:1. To correct the air-speed problems of the earlier generations, the intake ports in this cylinder head were re-designed to have a smaller cross-section, and hence it has been nicknamed the "smallport" head. This change in the intake ports negated the need for the earlier twin-runner intake manifold and it was replaced with a single-runner manifold. Additional engine modifications to extend life and reliability included under-piston cooling oil squirters, thicker connecting rods and other components. Also of note, the pistons were changed to utilize a  fully floating gudgeon pin unlike the  pressed-in pins of the earlier versions. Other internal revisions were made to the pistons. They were slightly modified to make space for the under-piston cooling oil squirters found in this engine version. All non-US market 4A-GEs continued to use a MAP sensor, while all of the US-market 4A-GE engines came with a MAF sensor.

The 4A-GE engine was first introduced in the 1983 Sprinter Trueno AE86 and the Corolla Levin AE86. The AE86 marked the end of the 4A-GE as a rear wheel drive (RWD or FR) mounted engine. Alongside the RWD AE86/AE85 coupes, a front wheel drive (FWD or FF) Corolla was produced and all future Corollas/Sprinters were based around the FF layout. The AW11 MR2 continued use of the engine as a rear mid-engine, rear-wheel-drive layout, transversely-mounted midship. The engine was retired from North American Corollas in 1991, although it continued to be available in the Geo Prizm GSi (sold through Chevrolet dealerships) from 1990 to 1992. All 4A-GE engines (including the 20-valve versions below) feature a forged crankshaft rather than a cheaper and more commonly used cast version.

Clarification: In the U.S. market, the 4A-GE engine was first used in the 1985 model year Corolla GT-S only, which is identified as an "AE88" in the VIN but uses the AE86 chassis code on the firewall as the AE88 is a "sub" version of the AE86. The 4A-GE engines for the 1985 model year are referred to as "blue top" as opposed to the later "red top" engines, because the paint color on the valve covers is different, to show the different engine revision, using different port sizes, different airflow metering, and other minor differences on the engine.

The American Spec AE86 (VIN AE88, or GT-S) carried the 4A-GE engine. In other markets, other designations were used. Much confusion exists, even among dealers, as to which models contained what equipment, especially since Toyota split the Corolla line into both RWD and FWD versions, and the GT-S designation was only well known as a Celica version at that time.

In 1993, the 4A-GE engine was dropped and replaced with the 7A-FE in South Africa even as other countries moved towards the 20-valve 4A-GE, as South African fuel was not suitable at the time for the 20-valve 4A-GE engines.

Applications

 AA63 Carina 1983.06–1985 (Japan only)
 AT160 Carina 1985–1988 (Japan only)
 AT171 Carina 1988–1992 (Japan only)
 AA63 Celica 1983–1985
 AT160 Celica 1985–1989
 AE82 Corolla saloon, FX 1984.10–1987
 AE86 Corolla Levin 1983.05–1987
 AE92 Corolla 1987–1993
 AT141 Corona 1983.10–1985 (Japan only)
 AT160 Corona 1985–1988 (Japan only)
 AW11 MR2 1984.06–1989
 AE82 Sprinter 1984.10–1987 (Japan only)
 AE86 Sprinter Trueno 1983.05–1987 (Japan only)
 AE92 Sprinter 1987–1992 (Japan only)
 AE82/AE92 Corolla GLi Twincam/Conquest RSi 1986–1993 (South Africa)
 Chevrolet Nova Twin Cam (based on Corolla AE82) 1988
 Geo Prizm GSi (based on Corolla AE92 chassis) 1990–1992

Specifications:
 Engine displacement: 
 Layout: DOHC Inline-4
 Bore and Stroke: 
 Dry Weight (with T50 gearbox): 
 Valves: 16, 4 per each cylinder
 Power:  at 6,600 rpm
 Torque:  at 5,800 rpm
 Redline: 7,600 rpm
 Fuel Delivery System: MPFI

4A-GE (20-valve)

Fourth Generation "Silver Top"
The fourth-generation 4A-GE engine was produced from 1991 to 1995. It has silver cam covers with chrome lettering, hence the nickname "silver top". This engine yet again features a completely new cylinder head which uses five valves per cylinder instead of four. It uses Toyota's Variable Valve Timing (VVT) system on the intake cam, an increased compression ratio (10.5:1), and the intake system was replaced with a short manifold with individual throttles and velocity stacks, however the vane-type airflow meter was retained, requiring the use of a plenum. The previous 16-valve head used a sharply curved intake port, while the 20-valve engine used a very upright straight port.

Applications:
 AE101 Corolla Levin coupe 1991–1995 (Japan only)
 AE101 Sprinter Trueno coupe 1991–1995 (Japan only)
 AE101 Corolla Ceres hardtop 1992–1995 (Japan only)
 AE101 Sprinter Marino hardtop 1992–1995 (Japan only)
 AT210 Carina 1996–2001 (Japan only)
 AE101 Corolla 1991–2000 (Japan only)
 AE101 Sprinter 1991–2000 (Japan only)

Fifth Generation "Black Top"
The fifth-generation 4A-GE engine produced from 1995 to 2000 is the final version of the 4A-GE engine and has black cam covers. It uses Toyota Variable Valve Timing (VVT) system on the intake cam. This engine is commonly known as the "black top" due to the color of the valve cover, and yet again features an even higher compression ratio (11:1). Additionally, the black top had a lighter flywheel, a larger plenum, lighter connecting rods and revised rubber velocity stacks, and was also offered in 1997 with a six-speed C160 transaxle. The 'Blacktop' has become a favorite among enthusiasts and is used as an easy power upgrade for the early Toyota Corolla models, especially for use in the drift scene. Due to the relatively high state of tuning of the stock engine, most power/torque gains come from higher lift cams and engine management. 

It has been believed that Toyota's power figures for the 20-valve engines are inflated; this is more than likely caused by people using less than 100 RON fuel (Japanese premium fuel standard) that both 20-valve engines require.

Applications

 AE111 Corolla Levin coupe 1995–2000 (Japan only)
 AE111 Sprinter Trueno coupe 1995–2000 (Japan only)
 AE101 Corolla Ceres hardtop 1995–1998 (Japan only)
 AE101 Sprinter Marino hardtop 1995–1998 (Japan only)
 AE101G Corolla BZ touring wagon 1995–1999 (Japan)
 AE111 Corolla 1995–2000 (Japan only)
 AE111 Sprinter 1995–1999 (Japan only)
 AE111 Sprinter Carib 1997–2000 (Japan only)
 AE111 Corolla RSi and RXi 1997–2002 (South Africa)
 AT210 Carina 1996-2001 (Japan only)

4A-GZE

The 4A-GZE (produced in various forms from August 1986 through 1995) was a supercharged version of the 4A-GE. Based on the same block and cylinder head, the 4A-GZE engine was equipped with a Roots type supercharger producing  peak manifold pressure, and the compression ratio was lowered to 8:1 with the use of forged and dished pistons. Although fitted with upgraded pistons, they still had the same ports, valve timing, and head gasket as the naturally aspirated 4A-GE engine, although T-VIS was omitted. In 1990 it was updated with the "smallport" cylinder head, 8.9:1 compression, and MAP D-Jetronic load sensing and a smaller supercharger pulley producing .

The 4A-GZE is also popular for turbo conversions, as many parts do not need to be modified to support the extra boost.

Applications:
 AE92 Corolla 1987–1991 (Japan only)
AE101 Corolla 1991–1995 (Japan only)
 AW11 MR2 1986–1989 (Japan, 1988-1989 North America)
 AE92 Sprinter 1987–1991 (Japan only)
 AE101 Sprinter 1991–1995 (Japan only)

Racing Applications
Due to its durability, performance and relatively low cost, 4A-GE and 4A-GZE engines and their derivatives have been popular for both professional and amateur racing since their introduction. The most notable application of the 4A-GE in racing was as in the Formula Atlantic series, where in full race trim the engine will produce  at 10,000 rpm.

5A

The  5A was produced from 1987 through 2006. The carbureted 5A-F was produced in 1987 and the fuel injected 5A-FE was produced that year and again from 1995 through 1998.

5A-F

Applications:
 AT170 Carina 1988–1990 (Japan only)
 AE91 Corolla 1987–1989 (Japan only)
 AT170 Corona 1987–1989 (Japan only)
 AE91 Sprinter 1987–1989 (Japan only)

5A-FE
Toyota joint venture partner Tianjin FAW Xiali produces the 5A-FE (dubbed 5A+) for its Vela and Weizhi (C1) subcompact sedans.

Applications

 Yema SQJ6451
 Xiali Vela (China)
 Xiali Weizhi (China)
 Geely CK (China)
 Geely MK (China)
 AT170 Carina 1990–1992 (Japan only)
 AT192 Carina 1992–1996 (Japan only)
 AT212 Carina 1996–2001 (Japan only)
 AE91 Corolla 1989–1992 (Japan only)
 AE100 Corolla 1991–2001 (Japan only)
 AE110 Corolla 1995–2000 (Japan only)
 AE100 Corolla Ceres 1992–1998 (Japan only)
 AT170 Corona 1989–1992 (Japan only)
 AL50 Soluna 1996–2003 (Asia)
 AE91 Sprinter 1989–1992 (Japan only)
 AE100 Sprinter 1991–1995 (Japan only)
 AE110 Sprinter 1995–2000(Japan only)
 AE100 Sprinter Marino 1992–1998 (Japan only)
 AXP42 Vios 2002–2006 (China only)

5A-FHE
Same as the first generation 5A-FE, only more aggressive tune for more output. Called an EFI-S engine.

This engine produces up to  due to slightly larger throttle than the standard 5A-FE and different cam profiles. 

Applications:
 AE91 Corolla 1989–1992 (Japan only)
 AE91 Sprinter 1989–1992 (Japan only)
 AE91 Toyota G Touring 1994–1999 (Japan only)
 AE100 Toyota G Touring 1994–1999 (Japan only)

6A

The  6A-FC was produced from 1989 through 1992. It is the only 1.4 variant of the A-series engines.

It is a 4-valve, narrow-valve angle DOHC engine, mainly installed in Australian and European market Corollas.

6A-FC
Applications:
 AE90 Corolla and Holden Nova 1989–1992 (Australia only)

7A

The largest production A-series engine was the  7A-FE, produced from 1993 through 2002. It is a 4-valve DOHC narrow-valve angle economy engine stroked out from the 4A, also using the 4A-FE's slave-cam concept. It is a non-interference type engine.

In the United States, the 7A-FE's most common application was in the 1993–1997 Corolla (7th generation). The engine was also used in some 1994–1999 Celicas (6th generation) at the base ST trim level, as well as the Toyota Corolla's clone, the Geo Prizm.

It appears in the eighth generation Corolla (AE112).

In the Australian market, the AE112 Corolla Sportivo had a turbocharged and intercooled 7A-FE, sometimes unofficially referred to as a 7A-FTE. This was a conversion rather than a ground-up turbo design, with the same 9.5:1 compression ratio as the naturally aspirated 7A-FE. Only 110 Corolla Sportivos were built.

Toyota never made a wide-valve angle high-performance "7A-GE" engine based on the 7A, but many enthusiasts have created one using a combination of 7A-FE parts (block and crank), 4A-GE parts (head, pistons) and custom connecting rods. The '7A-FE' has a smaller crank journal and smaller wrist pins (press fit), so a few companies have made special rods to accommodate these builds. Likewise, an unofficial supercharged "7A-GZE" has also been built from 7A-FE parts (block, crank), 4A-GZE parts (head, pistons) and custom connecting rods.

7A-FE
Applications:
 AT221 Avensis 1997–2000 (Europe only)
 AT191 Caldina 1996–1997 (Japan only)
 AT211 Caldina 1997–2001 (Japan only)
 AT191 Carina 1994–1996 (Japan only)
 AT211 Carina 1996–2001 (Japan only)
 AT191 Carina E 1994–1997 (Europe only)
 AT200 Celica 1993–1999 (excluding Japan)
 AE92 Corolla/Conquest September 1993 – circa 1998 (South Africa)
 AE93 Corolla 1990–1992 (Australia only)
 AE102/103 Corolla 1992–1998 (excluding Japan)
 AE102 Corolla/Prizm 1993–1997 (North America)
 AE111 Corolla 1997–2000 (South Africa)
 AE111 Corolla 1998–2002 (Brazil)
 AE112/115 Corolla 1997–2002 (excluding Japan)
 AE115 Corolla Spacio 1997–2001 (Japan only)
 AE115 Corolla Linea Terra 1997-1999 (Europe only)
 AT191 Corona 1994–1997 (excluding Japan)
 AT211 Corona 1996–2001 (Japan only)
 AE115 Sprinter Carib 1995–2001 (Japan only)
 AE112 Corolla 1998-2001 (Indonesia and Australia)

8A

The  8A was produced from 1990 through 2006 by Tianjin FAW Xiali for its Daihatsu and Toyota-based subcompacts. Compression ratio is 9.3:1.

8A-FE
Applications:
 AXP41 Toyota Vios 2002–2006 (China only)
 AXP41 Xiali Vizi 2002–2006 (China only)
 Haima CA7130 (China)
 Xiali 2000/Vela 2000–2012
 Xiali A+ 2005–2011
 Xiali Weizhi (China)
 Etsong Lubao QE6400/QE6440/FAW Lubao CA6410/Jiefang CA6440UA

Production
The 1.3 L and 1.5 L A engines are built in Tianjin FAW Toyota Engine Co., Ltd. Plant No. 1.

See also 
 List of Toyota engines

References

External links 

 4AGE.net—Articles & photos of 4AGE engined vehicles
 "4AGE to 7AGE conversion"—A good how-to
 "4A-GE engine rebuild by RSChita"
 4A-GE tech notes
 The Stock 4AGE Description Page
 "S-86.com"—SQ Engineering - has many 4age related articles
 Phil Bradshaw's 4A-GE info page 

A
Straight-four engines
Gasoline engines by model